Charles Taylor (24 March 1861 – 27 April 1944) was a member of the Queensland Legislative Assembly.

He was born in Melbourne, Victoria, the son of the George Taylor and his wife Mary Albina (née Holder). After attending the Church of England school in Ballarat he was an agent for a produce firm in Sydney, before running a seed and produce agency in Brisbane.

On 31 January 1884, Taylor married Emma Jane Skewes (died 1942) in Ballarat and together had two sons and a daughter. He died in Brisbane in April 1944 and was cremated at the Mount Thompson Crematorium.

Political career
Taylor started his career in politics as an alderman on the Windsor Town Council, including serving as mayor in 1915.

He entered Queensland state politics as a member of the National Party, winning the seat of Windsor at the 1918 state election. He held the seat until 1935, when he was defeated by Herbert Williams of the Labor Party. He was Leader of the Opposition from 1923 until 1924, and the Speaker of the Queensland Legislative Assembly from 1929 until 1932.

References

19th-century Anglicans
20th-century Anglicans
Australian Anglicans
Members of the Queensland Legislative Assembly
National Party (Queensland, 1917) members of the Parliament of Queensland
Politicians from Brisbane
Politicians from Melbourne
1861 births
1944 deaths